Gold Award for Best Debut Actor in a Lead Role - Female is an award given as part of its annual Gold Awards for TV serials, to recognize a debut actress who has delivered an outstanding performance in a leading role.

List of winners

2000s
2007 Divyanka Tripathi - Banoo Main Teri Dulhann  as Vidya Sagar Singh
Twinkle Bajpai - Ghar Ki Lakshmi Betiyaan as Lakshmi
Pallavi Subhash - Karam Apnaa Apnaa as Gauri Shiv Kapoor
Shalini Chandran - Kahaani Ghar Ghar Ki as Maithili
Suhasi Goradia Dhami - Aek Chabhi Hai Padoss Mein as Urmi
Shubhangi Atre Poorey - Kasturi as Kasturi
2008 Parul Chauhan - Sapna Babul Ka...Bidaai as Ragini
Sara Khan - Sapna Babul Ka...Bidaai as Sadhna
Parul Chauhan - Sapna Babul Ka...Bidaai as Ragini
Additi Gupta - Kis Desh Mein Hai Meraa Dil as Heer
Abigail Jain - Kya Dill Mein Hai as Kakoon
Avika Gor - Balika Vadhu as Anandi
2009 Not Awarded

2010s
2010 Ankita Lokhande - Pavitra Rishta as Archana Manav Deshmukh
Smriti Kalra - 12/24 Karol Bagh as Simran
Neha Jhulka - Dill Mill Gayye as Dr. Naina Mehta
Rubina Dilaik - Choti Bahu as Radhika
Shivshakti Sachdev - Sabki Laadli Bebo as Bebo
2011 Pratyusha Banerjee - Balika Vadhu as Anandi Jagdish Singh
Anupriya Kapoor - Tere Liye as Taani Banerjee
Neha Sargam - Chand Chupa Badal Mein as Nivedita
Giaa Manek - Saath Nibhaana Saathiya as Gopi Aham Modi
Rucha Hasabnis - Saath Nibhaana Saathiya as Rashi Jigar Modi
2012 Deepika Singh - Diya Aur Baati Hum as Sandhya Sooraj Rathi
Aakanksha Singh - Na Bole Tum Na Maine Kuch Kaha as Megha Mohan Bhatnagar
Mitali Nag - Afsar Bitiya as Krishna Raj
Aishwarya Sakhuja - Saas Bina Sasural as Tanya Tej Prakash Chaturvedi (Toasty)
Soumya Seth - Navya as Navya Anant Bajpai
Kirti Nagpure - Parichay—Nayee Zindagi Kay Sapno Ka as Siddhi Kunal Chopra
2013 Surbhi Jyoti - Qubool Hai as Zoya Siddiqui
Disha Parmar - Pyaar Ka Dard Hai Meetha Meetha Pyaara Pyaara as Pankhuri Aditya Kumar
Ekta Kaul - Rab Se Sohna Isshq as Sahiba Ranveer Singh
Roopal Tyagi - Sapne Suhane Ladakpan Ke as Gunjan
Shamin Mannan - Sanskaar – Dharohar Apnon Ki as Bhoomi Jaikishan Vaishnav
2014 Paridhi Sharma - Jodha Akbar as Jodha (tied with) Preetika Rao - Beintehaa as Aaliya Zain Abdullah
Pooja Sharma - Mahabharat as Draupadi
Digangana Suryavanshi - Ek Veer Ki Ardaas...Veera as Veera
Farnaz Shetty - Ek Veer Ki Ardaas...Veera as Gunjan
Harshita Gaur - Sadda Haq as Sanyukta Agarwal
2015 Radhika Madan - Meri Aashiqui Tum Se Hi as Ishani Ranveer Waghela
2016 Jasmin Bhasin - Tashan-e-Ishq as Twinkle (tied with) Ridhima Pandit - Bahu Hamari Rajni Kant as Rajni
2017 Shivangi Joshi - Yeh Rishta Kya Kehlata Hai as Naira Singhania
2018 Jannat Zubair Rahmani - Tu Aashiqui as Pankti (tied with) Bhumika Gurung - Nimki Mukhiya as Nimki
2019 Avneet Kaur - Aladdin - Naam Toh Suna Hoga as Princess Yasmine (tied with) Reem Shaikh - Tujhse Hai Raabta'' as Kalyani

References

Gold Awards
Gold Award